GJC may refer to:

 General de Jesus College, in San Isidro, Nueva Ecija, Philippines
 Global Justice Center, an American international human rights organization
 Gujarat Janata Congress, a political party in Gujarat, India
 NFL Global Junior Championship
 Gaius Julius Caesar, Roman military and political leader